Tony Longo (August 19, 1961 – June 21, 2015) was an American actor. Longo appeared in numerous television series, including Family Matters, The Facts of Life, Laverne & Shirley, Simon & Simon, Alice, Perfect Strangers, High Tide, Renegade, Sydney, Las Vegas, Six Feet Under and Monk. His film credits include Sixteen Candles, Mulholland Drive, Pound Puppies and the Legend of Big Paw, The Last Boy Scout, the 1994 version of Angels in the Outfield, The Cooler, Eraser, Suburban Commando, The Flintstones in Viva Rock Vegas, and Drake & Josh.

Early life and career
Born in Jersey City, New Jersey, Longo attended Marist High School in Bayonne, New Jersey and the University of Rhode Island.

Because of his ,  frame, Longo was often chosen for roles that depict him as an imposing giant with freakish strength, and sub-standard intelligence, such as Mad Dog in the 1980s comedy/drama 1st and Ten where he was a linebacker for the fictional football team, the California Bulls. Mad Dog was paired with fellow linebacker Dr. Death, played by actor Donald Gibb who has had a career playing similar roles as Longo. He also appeared in Suburban Commando starring Hulk Hogan as a bounty hunter alongside The Undertaker.

Death
Longo died in his sleep at his home in Marina del Rey, California on June 21, 2015 at the age of 53 after a long battle with congestive heart failure and kidney issues. He was survived by his  daughters Chloe Longo and Danielle Schramm, his stepdaughter Alexis Dejoria, and his wife of 23 years, Jamie Briggs.

Filmography

1981: Tarzan, the Ape Man as Stunts (uncredited)
1982: Pink Motel as Mark
1983: The Vals as Mike, Fraternity President
1984: Splash as Augie
1984: Sixteen Candles as 'Rock'
1985: Fletch as Detective #1
1985: Stitches as Student Jock
1987: Winners Take All as 'Bear' Nolan
1987: In the Mood as Carlo, Judy's Husband
1988: Pound Puppies and the Legend of Big Paw as Big Paw (voice)
1988: Illegally Yours as Konrat
1988: Feds as Sailor
1989: Bloodhounds of Broadway as 'Crunch' Sweeney
1989: Let It Ride as Simpson
1989: Worth Winning as Terry Childs
1989: Think Big as Supervisor
1990: Mr. Destiny as Huge Guy
1991: The Marrying Man as Sam
1991: Suburban Commando as 'Knuckles'
1991: The Art of Dying as Victor
1991: The Last Boy Scout as Ray 'Big Ray' Walton
1992: Unlawful Entry as Angelo 'Big Angelo'
1992: Rapid Fire as Brunner Gazzi
1993: Remote  as Louis
1993: Prehysteria! as Louis
1994: Angels in the Outfield as Triscuitt Messmer
1995: Houseguest as Joey Gasperini
1996: Eraser as Mike 'Little Mike'
1996: Big Packages as Phil
1997: Living in Peril as Truck Driver
1997: Family Matters as Butterball
2000: The Flintstones in Viva Rock Vegas as Rocko 'Big Rocko'
2001: Road to Redemption as Vincent, The Enforcer
2001: Lloyd Coach
2001: Mulholland Drive as Kenny
2001: Hard Luck as Bobby
2002: Fangs as Louis
2002: Serving Sara as Petey
2003: The Cooler as Tony
2003: How to Lose a Guy in 10 Days as Sensitive Moviegoer
2004: Drake & Josh as Zeke Braxton
2004: That's So Raven (TV Series) as Python
2005: Mr. & Mrs. Smith as Big Bad Bathroom Dude (uncredited)
2005: Souled Out as Soul Broker
2005: Hercules in Hollywood as Pool Hustler
2007: Bunny Whipped as Sandro
2007: The Fall of Night as 'Atlas'
2008: Jake's Corner as Gus
2009: Benny Bliss and the Disciples of Greatness as Tony
2010: Jelly as Random Guy
2010: Pizza with Bullets as Frankie 'Thats Right'
2010: Cause We're Family as Uncle Tony
2010: Pete Smalls Is Dead as Joey 'Sausa'
2010: Sinatra Club as Lenny
2010: Changing Hands as Vito
2011: From the Head as Customer G
2012: Changing Hands Feature as Unknown
2015: Intersection as Fighting Barfly (final film role)

References

External links
 

1961 births
2015 deaths
American male film actors
American male television actors
American people of Italian descent
Male actors from Jersey City, New Jersey
University of Rhode Island alumni